Jada Mae Facer (born March 18, 2001) is an American actress and singer. She played the recurring role of Joe's daughter, Dani, on the sitcom Melissa & Joey from 2014 to 2015. She has a YouTube channel and as of March 21, 2022, she has over 107 million views and 700 thousand subscribers.

Life and career
Facer was born in St. George, Utah, where she first became interested in acting after failing to be cast in a local production of Annie and subsequently trying out for a New York City production. The family later moved to Los Angeles, where she signed with an agency.

Her first major role was in the TV movie Love's Christmas Journey in 2011, in which she played the role of Annabelle. For this role, she won the Young Artist Award for Best Leading Young Actress in a TV Movie, Miniseries or Special.

She was also nominated for the Young Artist Award for Best Young Actress Ten and Under in a Short Film for her performance in the 2012 short film Nina Del Tango.

From 2014 to 2016, Facer played Joe's daughter, Dani, on the ABC Family sitcom Melissa & Joey.

She has appeared on a number of other TV shows including ABC's Mistresses, CBS's Bad Teacher, and Nickelodeon's Henry Danger.

Facer is also a singer-songwriter, saying in 2015 that she was inspired by Taylor Swift.

Filmography

Film

Television

Personal life
Her older brother is Kyson Facer from Nickelodeon's I Am Frankie.

References

External links
 

Actresses from Utah
American television actresses
Living people
People from St. George, Utah
2001 births
American women singer-songwriters
21st-century American actresses
21st-century American singers
21st-century American women singers
Singer-songwriters from Utah